Boletus fibrillosus is a basidiomycete fungus of the genus Boletus found in western North America. The fruiting bodies are found in mixed coastal forests in the fall, usually singly or in small groups. The cap is up to 17 cm wide, buff to brown to dark brown in color, and has a wrinkled to finely fibrous texture. The tubes are yellow, while the flesh is white to buff and does not stain when cut. The stem is yellowish at the top, brown otherwise, with a reticulate texture, and mycelium enshrouding the bottom. The holotype was collected in Mendocino County, California. The species is edible, but considered to have inferior taste to other edible boletes such as B. edulis, which it is often confused with. 

Phylogenetic analysis has shown B. fibrillosus as a member of a clade, or closely related group, with B. pinophilus, B. regineus, B. rex-veris, B. subcaerulescens, and Gastroboletus subalpinus.

See also
 List of Boletus species
List of North American boletes

References

External links

fibrillosus
Fungi of North America
Fungi described in 1975